Drachiella aglypha is a species of marine crab found in the Indo-Pacific region.

References 

Crabs
Indian Ocean
Pacific Ocean